A meat shank or shin is the portion of meat around the tibia of the animal, the leg bone beneath the knee and shoulder.

Lamb shanks are often braised whole; veal shanks are typically cross-cut.

Some dishes made using shank include:

 Bulalo, a Filipino beef shank stew.
 Ossobuco alla milanese, an Italian veal shank dish.
 Persian biryani, with different shanks.
 Nihari, a spicy national dish of Pakistan and a popular dish in North India with origin in Delhi, India. 
 Cazuela with beef shank meat, popular in 19th-century Chile during the nitrate boom.

Notes

See also
Beef shank
Pork knuckle
Pig's trotters

Cuts of meat